Shankill railway station was opened by the Dublin, Wicklow and Wexford Railway (DW&WR) on 10 July 1854 as part of the Harcourt Street line, initially Dundrum to Bray.  It is situated on Station Road some 650 metres south-west of the current Shankill station opened in 1977 on the Line from Pearse to Bray. The next station to the south was Woodbrook while to the north lay the Bride's Glen Viaduct and beyond that Carrickmines station. The station closed with the line closure of the whole line from Harcourt Street on 31 December 1958.

The station building remains and facade was covered up during construction of the Shankill Business Centre during the 1970s.

Gallery

See also 
 List of closed railway stations in Ireland

References

Disused railway stations in County Dublin
Railway stations opened in 1854
Railway stations closed in 1958
1854 establishments in Ireland
Railway stations in the Republic of Ireland opened in the 19th century